Totum pro parte is Latin for "the whole for a part"; it refers to a kind of metonymy. The plural is tota pro partibus, "wholes for parts". In a context of language, it means something is named after something of which it is only a part (or only a limited characteristic, not necessarily representative for the whole). A pars pro toto (in which a part is used to describe the whole) is the opposite of a totum pro parte.

In geography
Some place names of large areas are commonly used to refer synonymously to a smaller part of the larger area than is strictly deemed correct. Examples of this include:

 "America" for the United States (see use of the word American)
 "Asia" for East Asia, South Asia and Southeast Asia (conversely, Asia itself can also be considered a pars pro toto: originally the name referred only to what is now called Asia Minor)
 "China" for the People's Republic of China since the 1970s, and prior to that, the Republic of China
 "The Congo" for the Republic of the Congo or the Democratic Republic of the Congo
 "Europe" for the European Union or for Continental Europe excluding the British Isles
 "Germany" was often used for West Germany during the Cold War
 "Ireland" for the Republic of Ireland excluding Northern Ireland
 "Korea" for either of the two sovereign states on the peninsula, South Korea or North Korea
 "Macedonia" for the Republic of North Macedonia (see Macedonia naming dispute)
 "Micronesia" for the Federated States of Micronesia 
 Nanyang, Maritime Southeast Asia, Malay Archipelago, Sunda Islands for Indonesia
 "Ulster" for Northern Ireland
 "Western Hemisphere" for the Americas
 "Yemen" was often used for North Yemen
 "Northumbria" for North East England or historic Northumberland and County Durham

Other examples
The verb "to drink" is often used in this manner. Depending on context it can stand for the generic, standard definition "to consume a liquid" (e.g. "I'm thirsty, is there anything to drink?") or for the narrow, limited definition "to imbibe alcoholic beverages" (e.g. "He goes out to drink too often"). Also, fluid can be used for liquid, as in brake fluid or bodily fluid. (The presence of air, a fluid, is not wanted when there is low fluid.)

The "Internet" for the "World Wide Web (WWW)"; the Internet is a network of computer networks, whereas the WWW is a network of hypertext documents that one accesses via the Internet.

When someone asks, "Is it a PC or a Mac?", they are actually asking whether it's a PC (personal computer) running the Microsoft Windows operating system, or one of a line of PCs made by Apple called a Mac. A PC is in fact any computer used for personal purposes, and can effectively be running one of many different operating systems.

In the United States, "Congress" is used to refer to the legislative body of the government, including both the House of Representatives (the House) and the Senate. The term congressman or congresswoman means "member of the House (of Representatives)". 

An athletic team is often called by the name of the whole (e.g. a city, country or organization) it represents: 
 "Go Navy: beat Army" (a cheer for the team representing the United States Naval Academy in a contest against the team representing the United States Military Academy)
 "Houston will be in New York this weekend"
 "Russia thrashed the Czech Republic" (the Russia national football team defeated the Czech Republic national football team).

When people talk about "the summer", they very often mean just the summer vacation period (often from six weeks to 2-3 months, depending on the place) and not necessarily the whole summer season.

In pharmacies in Quebec, the prescription plan of the Régie de l'assurance maladie du Québec (RAMQ) is often referred to just as RAMQ, even though the RAMQ is the government health insurance board of Quebec and as such makes provincial health insurance cards (among other things).

See also
Hyperbole
Metonymy
Pars pro toto
Synecdoche

References

Figures of speech
Latin words and phrases
Synecdoche